Hans Heinz Stuckenschmidt (1 November 1901 – 15 August 1988) was a German composer, musicologist, and historian and critic of music.

Life 
Stuckenschmidt was born in Strasbourg.  At as early an age as 19, he was the Berlin-based music critic/correspondent for the Prague-based periodical Bohemia, and lived as a freelance music writer in Hamburg, Vienna, Paris, Berlin and Prague, becoming personally acquainted with numerous composers of avant-garde music.

Amongst his most prominent musical productions were the "new music" concert cycle in Hamburg, and the 1927-8 concerts of the Berlin November Group with Max Butting.

In 1929, Stuckenschmidt became the successor to Adolf Weissmans as the music critic at the Berliner Zeitung am Mittag.  Due to political pressure owing to the newly empowered Nazi regime, he left the paper, later moving to Prague.  At the end of the 1930s, he was conscripted into the armed forces as an interpreter.

After the end of the war, Stuckenschmidt became the director of "new music" at the RIAS American-run radio station in Berlin, and in 1947, the music critic of the Neuen Zeitung and of the influential Berlin Newspaper Der Tagesspiegel, later also becoming a professor at the Music Department of the Technische Universität Berlin.

Amongst his most prominent work were writings on Arnold Schoenberg, Boris Blacher, Ferruccio Busoni and Maurice Ravel.  Stuckenschmidt received numerous honours for his work, and was a member of the Deutsche Akademie für Sprache und Dichtung, Darmstadt.

In Darmstadt he also taught at the Darmstädter Ferienkurse.  He died in Berlin, aged 86.

References 

20th-century German musicians
German music critics
Musicologists from Berlin
Members of the Academy of Arts, Berlin
People from Alsace-Lorraine
Musicians from Strasbourg
1901 births
1988 deaths
German male non-fiction writers
Members of the German Academy for Language and Literature
20th-century German musicologists
Pupils of Arnold Schoenberg
Ravel scholars
Academic staff of the Technical University of Berlin